One Particular Harbour is the twelfth studio album by American popular music singer-songwriter Jimmy Buffett.  It was released in September 1983 as MCA 5447 and was produced by Buffett and Michael Utley.  It was Buffett's first involvement producing an album. "Stars on the Water" was written by and a minor hit for country music songsmith Rodney Crowell and also covered by Texan country music singer George Strait on his 2001 album, The Road Less Traveled.

Songs
In addition to songs written or co-written by Buffett (including one with J.D. Souther and Josh Leo), the album includes four cover songs: "Stars on the Water" by country songwriter Rodney Crowell, "California Promises" by Steve Goodman, "Brown Eyed Girl" by Van Morrison, and "Why You Wanna Hurt My Heart?" written by the Neville Brothers' Art Neville.  Buffett's version of "Stars on the Water" also appeared on the soundtrack to the 1993 movie The Firm.

Chart performance
One Particular Harbour reached No. 59 on the Billboard 200 album chart and No. 35 on the Billboard Top Country Albums chart.  The song "One Particular Harbour" hit No. 22 Adult Contemporary and "Brown Eyed Girl" made it to No. 13 Adult Contemporary.

Critical reception

Allmusic reviewer William Ruhlmann says One Particular Harbour was something like a comeback, with Buffett's best batch of songs since Son of a Son of a Sailor in 1978" and the title single, "One Particular Harbour," is a fan favorite, and is sometimes considered part of "The Big 8" that Buffett has played at almost all of his concerts.

Track listing

Side 1:
"Stars on the Water" (Rodney Crowell) – 3:16
"I Used to Have Money One Time" (Jimmy Buffett, Michael Utley) – 3:25
"Livin' It Up" (Jimmy Buffett, Josh Leo, J.D. Souther) – 2:59
"California Promises" (Steve Goodman) – 3:42
"One Particular Harbour" (Jimmy Buffett, Bobby Holcomb) – 5:44

Side 2:
"Why You Wanna Hurt My Heart?" (Arthur Neville) – 2:42
"Honey Do" (Jimmy Buffett, Michael Utley) – 4:32
"We Are the People Our Parents Warned Us About" (Jimmy Buffett) – 3:21
"Twelve Volt Man" (Jimmy Buffett) – 4:00
"Brown Eyed Girl" (Van Morrison) – 3:55
"Distantly in Love" (Jimmy Buffett) – 2:53

Personnel
The Coral Reefer Band:
Jimmy Buffett – lead vocals, acoustic guitar
Michael Utley – piano, organ, synthesizer, arrangements
Josh Leo – backing vocals, electric guitar, acoustic guitar, mandolin
Sam Clayton – backing vocals, congas, percussion
Bob Glaub – bass
Russ Kunkel – drums
Robert Greenidge – steel drums on “One Particular Harbour” and “Brown Eyed Girl”
Errol "Crusher" Bennett – percussion, congas
Matt Betton – drums, saxophone
Danny Burns – backing vocals, bass
Alan Estes – percussion
David Jackson – upright bass
Earl Klugh – gut-string guitar
Vince Melamed – backing vocals, synthesizer
Thom Mooney – drums
Frank Bama, Bonnie Bramlett, Rita Coolidge, David Lasley, Debra McColl, Arnold McCuller, Timothy B. Schmit, The Chorale Epherona – background vocals

Singles
"One Particular Harbour" b/w "Distantly in Love" (Released on MCA 52298 in October 1983)
"Brown Eyed Girl" b/w "Twelve Volt Man" (Released on MCA 52333 in January 1984)

Notes

Jimmy Buffett albums
1983 albums
Albums produced by Michael Utley
MCA Records albums